Jabhala is a village in Assandh mandal in  Karnal district of Haryana, India.  It is about 2.85km from the village of Rangrutti Khera.

Villages in Karnal district